Julio Cardeñosa Rodríguez (born 27 October 1949) is a Spanish former footballer who played as a central midfielder.

During his extensive career he played almost exclusively for Betis, retiring well past his 30s. He represented Spain in one World Cup and one European Championship.

Club career
Born in Valladolid, Castile and León, Cardeñosa arrived at Real Betis from local Real Valladolid in 1974, and remained there until his retirement. Left-footed, he possessed great technical ability which belied his thin physical build, and amassed 412 overall appearances for the Andalusians (307 in ten La Liga seasons), helping the club lift the Copa del Rey in 1977.

Cardeñosa retired at almost 36, then took up coaching mainly in the region. He started as a youth manager at Betis, and had two meaningless stints with the first team, including in 1990–91's top flight – seven matches, with eventual relegation.

Cardeñosa returned to Betis in 2010, as part of newly appointed manager Pepe Mel's coaching staff.

International career
Cardeñosa earned eight caps for Spain. His debut came on 30 November 1977 in a 1978 FIFA World Cup qualifier against Yugoslavia, playing the full 90 minutes in the decisive 1–0 away win.

Cardeñosa was subsequently picked for the final stages in Argentina. There, he notoriously missed an open goal chance in the group stage against Brazil in an eventual 0–0 draw, with Spain being eliminated precisely by the South Americans. He also represented the nation at UEFA Euro 1980.

Honours
Betis
Copa del Rey: 1976–77

References

External links

1949 births
Living people
Footballers from Valladolid
Spanish footballers
Association football midfielders
La Liga players
Segunda División players
Real Valladolid Promesas players
Real Valladolid players
Real Betis players
Spain amateur international footballers
Spain international footballers
1978 FIFA World Cup players
UEFA Euro 1980 players
Spanish football managers
La Liga managers
Segunda División managers
Segunda División B managers
Real Betis managers
Córdoba CF managers
Écija Balompié managers